Lara Naki Gutmann (born 6 November 2002) is an Italian figure skater. She is the 2020 Nordics champion, the 2019 Dragon Trophy silver medalist, the 2018 Bosphorus Cup silver medalist, and a three-time Italian national champion (2021–23). She has reached the final segment at three ISU Championships, with a top-ten result at the 2023 European Championships.

Career

Early years
Gutmann began learning to skate in 2006. She won her first junior national medal, bronze, in December 2015 and had the same result the following year.

Her ISU Junior Grand Prix (JGP) debut came in October 2017. In December 2017, she became the Italian junior national silver medalist.

2018–2019 season
Gutmann placed nineteenth at her sole JGP assignment in Austria. In December 2018, making her first senior international appearance, she won silver at the Bosphorus Cup in Turkey. Later that month, she won bronze in the senior ladies' category at the Italian Championships, behind Alessia Tornaghi and Lucrezia Beccari, and was named in Italy's team to the 2019 European Championships. Ranked twenty-ninth in the short program, she did not advance to the final segment at the latter event, which took place in January in Minsk, Belarus.

2019–2020 season
Gutmann competed mainly in the senior ranks, with the exception of two JGP events. She finished sixth at JGP France and seventh at JGP Italy. In December, she repeated as national bronze medalist, this time finishing third behind Tornaghi and Marina Piredda. In February, she won silver behind Roberta Rodeghiero at the Dragon Trophy in Ljubljana, Slovenia, and then outscored Emmi Peltonen to take gold at the Nordic Championships in Stavanger, Norway.

2020–2021 season
In the off-season, Gutmann underwent ankle surgery. She was scheduled to make her Grand Prix debut at the 2020 Internationaux de France, but the event was cancelled as a result of the COVID-19 pandemic. In December, she won the gold medal at the Italian championships.

As the Italian national champion, Gutmann was named as the country's sole entry to the 2021 World Championships in Stockholm, where she finished twenty-eighth. Subsequently, she was announced as part of the Italian team for the 2021 World Team Trophy.  Gutmann placed seventh in both segments of the competition and set personal bests in the free skate and total score, while Team Italy finished in fourth place.

2021–2022 season 
Gutmann began the season on home soil at the 2021 CS Lombardia Trophy. After a poor short program left her in eighteenth position going into the free skate, she placed third in that segment and rose to fifth overall. She next competed at the 2021 CS Nebelhorn Trophy, seeking to qualify for a berth for Italian women at the 2022 Winter Olympics. Seventh in both segments of the competition, she placed eighth overall, 0.75 points behind Australia's Kailani Craine, who took the sixth of six available places. As a result, Italy became the first alternate country.

Following the cancellation of the 2021 Cup of China, Italy unexpectedly became the host of the third event in the Grand Prix, the 2021 Gran Premio d'Italia. Gutmann was one of two Italian women assigned to compete at the home Grand Prix (along with Lucrezia Beccari), making her Grand Prix debut with an eleventh-place finish.

At the Italian Championships, Gutmann won her second straight national title. She was after that named to the Italian Olympic team, though she would only be competing in the team event. She began the new year at the 2022 European Championships, finishing sixteenth. Representing Italy in the team event, Gutmann skated cleanly in the short program, but did not attempt a triple-triple jump combination and finished ninth of ten skaters. The Italian team finished seventh among the teams in the short program segments and did not advance to the second phase. Gutmann finished the season with a twentieth place at the 2022 World Championships.

2022–2023 season 
In three appearances on the Challenger circuit in the fall, Gutmann finished sixth on home ice at the 2022 CS Lombardia Trophy before winning the silver medal at the 2022 CS Nepela Memorial. She finished the series with a fourth-place at the 2022 CS Golden Spin of Zagreb, and then won her third straight national title.

Assigned to compete at the 2023 European Championships, Gutmann was thirteenth in the short program, but an eighth-place free skate lifted her to eighth overall. This achieved her primary goal of finishing in the top ten and earning a second berth for Italy the following year.

Programs

Competitive highlights 
GP: Grand Prix; CS: Challenger Series; JGP: Junior Grand Prix

Detailed results 
Small medals for short and free programs awarded only at ISU Championships.

ISU Personal best in bold.

Senior results

Junior results

References

External links 
 

2002 births
Italian female single skaters
Living people
Sportspeople from Trento
Figure skaters at the 2022 Winter Olympics
Olympic figure skaters of Italy